Manfred Queck (10 August 1941 – 1 July 1977) was a German ski jumper. He competed in the normal hill and large hill events at the 1968 Winter Olympics.

References

External links
 

1941 births
1977 deaths
German male ski jumpers
Olympic ski jumpers of East Germany
Ski jumpers at the 1968 Winter Olympics
People from Johanngeorgenstadt
Sportspeople from Saxony